St. Peters Church and Buildings is a historic church at Main Street and DeVoe Avenue in Spotswood, Middlesex County, New Jersey, United States.

It was built in 1847 and added to the National Register of Historic Places on October 10, 1979.

References

Episcopal church buildings in New Jersey
Churches on the National Register of Historic Places in New Jersey
Gothic Revival church buildings in New Jersey
Churches completed in 1847
19th-century Episcopal church buildings
Churches in Middlesex County, New Jersey
National Register of Historic Places in Middlesex County, New Jersey
New Jersey Register of Historic Places
1847 establishments in New Jersey
Spotswood, New Jersey